Lito may refer to:

People
 Lito (Cape Verdean footballer) (born 1975), Cape Verdean footballer
 Lito (footballer) (born 1956), Portuguese footballer
 Lito Vidigal (born 1969), Angolan footballer known as "Lito"
 Manuel Costas (footballer, born 1947), Spanish footballer
 Lito Atienza (born 1941), Filipino politician and former mayor of the city of Manila
 Lito Sheppard (born 1981), American football player
 Lito Sisnorio (1982–2007), Filipino boxer who died during a bout
 half of Lito & Polaco, a Puerto Rican hip hop/reggaeton duo

Other uses
 Lupinus toratensis, a species of Lupinus, a genus of flowering plants

See also
 Leto (disambiguation)
 Litos (disambiguation)
 Litto (disambiguation)

Masculine given names